Bao Xu is a fictional character in Water Margin, one of the Four Great Classical Novels in Chinese literature. Nicknamed "God of Death", he ranks 60th among the 108 Stars of Destiny and 24th among the 72 Earthly Fiends.

Background
Bao Xu is ugly-looking with a face shaped and coloured like the bottom of a wok, fierce bulging eyes and lips like those of a wolf. His voice is thunderous and terrifying. Bao, a skilled fighter who uses a broad-bladed sword, is nicknamed "God of Death" as he likes to kill and plunder. He leads a bandit gang on Mount Deadwood in Kouzhou (寇州; believed to be present-day Guan County, Shandong).

Joining Liangshan
The imperial military officers Shan Tinggui and Wei Dingguo capture Liangshan's Xuan Zan and Hao Siwen at Lingzhou (凌州; present-day Ling County, Shandong), who have come with Guan Sheng to head them off before they set out on the mission to exterminate their stronghold by order of the Song court. Shan and Wei send the two captives to the imperial capital Dongjing (東京; present-day Kaifeng, Henan) for punishment.

Meanwhile, Li Kui has secretly left for Lingzhou after Song Jiang forbade him from being part of Guan Sheng's expedition. He gets into a fight with Jiao Ting on the way after accusing the other of staring at him. Jiao, who is a skilled wrestler, easily floors him twice. However, he is glad to learn that the dark fellow is Li Kui. Jiao, who is heading to Mount Deadwood to join Bao Xu's band, invites Li to go with him, suggesting that they could work out something with Bao about Lingzhou.

At Mount Deadwood, Bao Xu welcomes Li's invitation to join Liangshan. Just then the troops escorting Xuan Zan and Hao Siwen come past the hill and are set upon by Bao and his men. After rescuing the two, Li Kui leads an attack on a gate of Lingzhou, breaking into it, when Wei Dingguo is battling with Guan Sheng outside the city. Earlier, Guan has captured and won over Shan Tinggui. After Wei also surrendered, Guan takes the group, including Bao Xu, back to Liangshan.

Campaigns and death
Bao Xu is appointed as one of the leaders of the Liangshan infantry after the 108 Stars of Destiny came together in what is called the Grand Assembly. He participates in the campaigns against the Liao invaders and rebel forces in Song territory following amnesty from Emperor Huizong for Liangshan.

In the battle of Hangzhou in the campaign against Fang La, Bao Xu and Li Kui are assigned to attack the city's north gate. After slaying the enemy officer Lian Ming, Bao Xu charges into the city where he finds himself surrounded by hiding troops. He is sliced in two by the enemy general Shi Bao.

References
 
 
 
 
 
 
 

72 Earthly Fiends
Fictional characters from Shandong